The Renault R29 is a Formula One racing car designed by the Renault F1 Team, with which they contested the 2009 Formula One World Championship (originally as ING Renault F1 Team, then, following loss of title sponsorship from the ING Group after "Crashgate", Renault F1 Team). The chassis was designed by Bob Bell, James Allison, Tim Densham and Dirk de Beer with Pat Symonds overseeing the design and production of the car as Executive Director of Engineering and Rob White leading the engine design. The car was driven by Fernando Alonso,  Nelson Piquet Jr. and Romain Grosjean.

Launch
The R29 was launched on 19 January 2009 at the Algarve circuit in Portugal.

Testing
Initial testing was conducted at the Portimao circuit along with rivals Williams, McLaren, Toyota and Toro Rosso from 19 January 2009 to 22 January 2009. Nelson Piquet Jr. was scheduled to drive for the first two days, followed by Fernando Alonso on the final two.

Season review
Coming off a resurgent second half of the previous year, the team expected to be fighting for both the drivers and constructors titles. Instead, the car proved to be disappointing. Fernando Alonso scored all of the team's 26 points. In the hands of either of Alonso's team mates, the car was often towards the back of the field with Nelson Piquet Jr. and Romain Grosjean often failing to reach Q2. Unlike many other 2009 cars that began the year uncompetitively, such as the McLaren MP4-24, the R29 showed no sign of improvement throughout the season, and arguably became less competitive over the course of the year, despite Alonso's third place in Singapore, which was Renault's only podium finish of the season.

Sponsorship
ING Group initially remained the team's primary sponsor, carrying over from 2008. However, in the wake of the Renault Formula One crash controversy, ING terminated their contract with immediate effect. Their logo on the car simply being replaced by the word Renault from the 2009 Singapore Grand Prix onwards.  French oil company Elf Aquitaine was replaced as a team partner by Elf's parent company, Total S.A., adding red accents to the car's livery There is still an Elf logo on the engine cover.

Complete Formula One results
(key) (results in bold indicate pole position; results in italics indicate fastest lap)

References

External links

2009 Formula One season cars
R29